The Central Ohio Fire Museum is a firefighting museum in downtown Columbus, Ohio. The museum is housed in the former Engine House No. 16 of the Columbus Fire Department, built in 1908. It was listed on the Columbus Register of Historic Properties in 1983 and the National Register of Historic Places in 1995.

The building was completed in 1908, built as the last in the city to accommodate horse-drawn engines (the transition to motorized equipment began one year later). It was remodeled several times for larger equipment, and was closed in 1982 when the new Engine House No. 1 was built two blocks away. The city began leasing the station to the Central Ohio Fire Museum, which facilitated a restoration of the building's exterior in 1990. The facade's third story and decorative parapet were rebuilt, along with the top of its hose tower. New doors were added based on the original design as well.

See also
 National Register of Historic Places listings in Columbus, Ohio

References

External links

Fire stations on the National Register of Historic Places in Ohio
Late 19th and Early 20th Century American Movements architecture
Fire stations completed in 1908
Museums in Columbus, Ohio
2002 establishments in Ohio
Museums established in 2002
Firefighting museums in the United States
Buildings in downtown Columbus, Ohio
Museums on the National Register of Historic Places
National Register of Historic Places in Columbus, Ohio
Columbus Register properties
Fire stations in Columbus, Ohio
1908 establishments in Ohio